Jim Papai (born c. 1949) was a Canadian football player who played for the Hamilton Tiger-Cats and Edmonton Eskimos. He won the Grey Cup with Hamilton in 1972. He played college football on a football scholarship at the University of North Carolina at Chapel Hill.

References

1940s births
Living people
Edmonton Elks players
Hamilton Tiger-Cats players
Players of Canadian football from Ontario
Sportspeople from Brantford
North Carolina Tar Heels football players
Canadian players of American football